Star of President Order – order of Turkmenistan.

Description 
Order of the star of the President as the form of a star with 12 rays. In the centre of each beam is stone chrysoprase diameter 2 mm. In the center of the star is the image circle diameter 1,5 mm, covered with green enamel. In the center of the circle is made of gold-domed profile image of the first President of Turkmenistan Saparmurat Niyazov. The width of the image 10 mm, height 15 mm. In the center of the star at a distance 2 mm from the green ring on the coöperation hosts 12 stone chrysoprase, the diameter of each of which is 2 mm. The diameter of the circular part of the order 47 mm.

On the reverse of the order is: «Ýyldyzy» Turkmenistanyň «Prezidentiň ordeni» (Order Of The Star Of The President Of Turkmenistan»). Letter size 4×2 mm. The order is made of gold. Block and connecting ear are made from vermeil.

Recipients
 Gurbanguly Berdimuhamedow – Turkmen president.
 Oleg Kononenko – Russian cosmonaut.
 Abdullah Gül – Turkish president.

References

Orders, decorations, and medals of Turkmenistan
Awards established in 1992